Malcolm MacLeod may refer to:

Malcolm MacLeod (clan chief), Scottish clan chief
Malcolm MacLeod (British Army officer) (1882–1969), British scientist and Director General of the Ordnance Survey from 1935 to 1943. 
Malcolm MacLeod (politician), politician from New Brunswick, Canada
Malcolm MacLeod (aviator) (1897–1960), World War I flying ace
Malcolm Macleod, former Rector of the University of Edinburgh, 1994–1997